The 2022 Kansas Lottery 200 was the 19th stock car race of the 2022 NASCAR Camping World Truck Series, the final race of the Round of 10, and the 2nd iteration of the event. The race was held on Friday, September 9, 2022, in Kansas City, Kansas at Kansas Speedway, a  permanent oval-shaped racetrack. The race took the scheduled 134 laps to complete. In an exciting battle on the final lap, John Hunter Nemechek, driving for Kyle Busch Motorsports, took over the lead from Carson Hocevar, and earned his 13th career NASCAR Camping World Truck Series win, and his second of the season. Nemechek dominated the entire race as well, leading 88 laps. Hocevar had attempted to win the race on fuel milage, but was unsuccessful as he ran out of fuel on the last lap. To fill out the podium, Ryan Preece, driving for David Gilliland Racing, would finish 3rd, respectively.

Zane Smith, Chandler Smith, John Hunter Nemechek, Grant Enfinger, Ben Rhodes, Stewart Friesen, Ty Majeski, Christian Eckes, would advance into the Round of 8. Hocevar and Matt Crafton would fail to advance.

Background 
Kansas Speedway is a  tri-oval race track in the Village West area near Kansas City, Kansas, United States. It was built in 2001 and it currently hosts two annual NASCAR race weekends. The IndyCar Series also held races at the venue until 2011. The speedway is owned and operated by NASCAR.

Entry list 

 (R) - denotes rookie driver
 (i) - denotes driver who is ineligible for series driver points.

Practice 
The only 30-minute practice session was held on Friday, September 9, at 2:00 PM CST.

Qualifying 
Qualifying was held on Friday, September 9, at 2:30 PM CST. Since Kansas Speedway is an oval track, the qualifying system used is a single-car, one-lap system with only one round. Whoever sets the fastest time in the round wins the pole.

Race results 
Stage 1 Laps: 30

Stage 2 Laps: 30

Stage 3 Laps: 748

Standings after the race 

Drivers' Championship standings

Note: Only the first 10 positions are included for the driver standings.

References 

2022 NASCAR Camping World Truck Series
NASCAR races at Kansas Speedway
Kansas Lottery 200
2022 in sports in Kansas